Songs for Sunday Evening is a 1950 album by Jo Stafford and Gordon MacRae.

Track listing 

 Long, Long Ago
 Juanita
 In the Gloaming
 Last Night (Alice Mattulath / Halfdan Kjerulf)
 Stars of the Summer Night (Isaac B. Woodbury)
 Sweet and Low
 Love's Old Sweet Song
 Now the Day Is Over (Sabine Baring-Gould / Joseph Barnby)

References

1950 albums
Jo Stafford albums
Capitol Records albums
Gordon MacRae albums